The 1983 Central American and Caribbean Championships in Athletics were held at the Estadio Pedro Marrero in Havana, Cuba between 22–24 July.

Medal summary

Men's events

Women's events

Medal table

See also
1983 in athletics (track and field)

External links
Men Results – GBR Athletics
Women Results – GBR Athletics

Central American and Caribbean Championships in Athletics
Central American and Caribbean Championships
A
Central American And Caribbean Championships In Athletics, 1983
International athletics competitions hosted by Cuba